The Australia men's national soccer team represents the country of Australia in international association football. It is fielded by Football Federation Australia, the governing body of soccer in Australia, and competes as a member of the Asian Football Confederation (AFC), which encompasses the countries of Asia, having previously been a part of the Oceania Football Confederation, which encompasses the countries of Oceania. Australia competed in their first match on 17 June 1922, a 3–1 loss with New Zealand at Carisbrook Park.

Australia have competed in numerous competitions, and all players who have played in 10 or more matches, either as a member of the starting eleven or as a substitute, are listed below. Each player's details include his playing position while with the team, the number of caps earned and goals scored in all international matches, and details of the first and most recent matches played in. The names are initially ordered by number of caps (in descending order), then by date of debut, then by alphabetical order.

Introduction
The first player to be capped 10 times by Australia was George Cartwright, who played his 10th and final match in a 1–0 win against Canada on 26 July 1924 in a friendly. The appearance record is held by goalkeeper Mark Schwarzer, which he set on 22 January 2011 in a 1–0 win with Iraq in the 2014 FIFA World Cup qualifying. Schwarzer's last match for Australia was against Brazil on 7 September 2013 in a friendly, finishing his Australia career on 109 caps.

The goalscoring record is held by Tim Cahill, with 50 goals in 108 matches, scored between 2004 and 2018. He set the record with his 29th goal on 19 November 2013, in a 1–0 win over Costa Rica in a friendly. Australia's second highest goalscorer is Damian Mori, with 29 goals from 45 matches, who held the record for almost 13 years before being surpassed by Cahill in 2014.

Key

Players
All statistics are correct up to and including the match played on 27 January 2022.

See also
List of Australia international soccer players with one cap
List of Australia international soccer players (2–3 caps)
List of Australia international soccer players (4–9 caps)

References

Inline citations

External links
Football Federation Australia official website

Lists of Australia international soccer players
Australia national soccer team records and statistics
Association football player non-biographical articles